Pant-gwyn is a small village in the community of Llangoedmor, Ceredigion, Wales, which is 72.8 miles (117.1 km) from Cardiff and 193.9 miles (312.1 km) from London. Pant-gwyn is represented in the Senedd by Elin Jones (Plaid Cymru) and the Member of Parliament is Ben Lake (Plaid Cymru).

References

See also 
 List of localities in Wales by population

Villages in Ceredigion